William Rose (born March 23, 1987) is a former American football fullback. He was an undrafted rookie free agent signed by the Titans. He played college football at Florida Atlantic.

College career
Rose spent three years as a starter at Florida Atlantic with a strong senior season, rushing for 307 yards on 62 carries while adding 29 catches for 302 yards. Widely considered the most dominant fullback in the Sun Belt Conference, he averaged 5.0 yards per carry and 6.9 per reception. Rose had a strong performance against then-No. 24 Nebraska on Sept. 5, 2009, with three receptions for 59 yards - the second-highest total of his career.

Professional career
Rose was an undrafted rookie free agent signed by the Tennessee Titans following the 2010 NFL Draft. However, he was waived due to a back injury before the season.

References

External links
William "Willie" Rose top fullback h-back 2010 nfl draft

Living people
1987 births
Players of American football from Tampa, Florida
American football defensive ends
Tennessee Titans players